Robbie Servais (born 8 March 1976) is a former Dutch footballer and current assistant manager of MVV Maastricht.

Club career
Born in Maastricht, Servais was involved in the youth set-up at hometown club MVV Maastricht. Whilst studying at Maastricht University, Servais joined SV Meerssen, playing under Bert van Marwijk. Following a six-year spell at Meerssen, Servais played for Hoofdklasse clubs  and VV Baronie. At the end of his career, Servais moved to Vietnam to play for Song Lam Nghe An.

Managerial career
In 2018, Servais managed Singapore U19. During the 2018 FIFA World Cup, Servais was a part of former manager Bert van Marwijk's backroom staff for Australia. In May 2019, Servais was appointed manager of Brunei.

In the summer 2019, Servais was appointed assistant manager of Fuat Usta at MVV Maastricht. He also took charge of MVV's U-19 squad from the summer 2020. On 30 March 2021, Servais signed a new two-year deal with MVV, continuing as a part-time first team assistant coach and full-time U-21 manager.

References

External links
Robbie Servais at Footballdatabase

1976 births
Living people
Footballers from Maastricht
Dutch footballers
Association football midfielders
V.League 1 players
SV Meerssen players
Song Lam Nghe An FC players
Dutch football managers
Brunei national football team managers
Dutch expatriate footballers
Dutch expatriate football managers
Dutch expatriate sportspeople in Vietnam
Expatriate footballers in Vietnam
Dutch expatriate sportspeople in Brunei
Expatriate football managers in Brunei
Dutch expatriate sportspeople in Singapore
Expatriate football managers in Singapore